This is a list of Jamaican writers, including writers either from or associated with Jamaica.

A
 Peter Abrahams (1919–2017)
 Opal Palmer Adisa (born 1954)
 Lester Afflick (1956–2000)

B
 Amy Bailey (1895–1990)
 Gwyneth Barber Wood (died 2006)
 Mary Anne Barker (1831–1911)
 Lindsay Barrett (born 1941)
 Richard Bathurst (died 1762)
 Edward Baugh (born 1936)
 Vera Bell (1906–?)
 Louise Bennett-Coverley (1919–2006)
 James Berry (1924–2017)
 Jacqueline Bishop (living)
 Eliot Bliss (1903–1990)
 Cedella Booker (1926–2008) 
 Jean "Binta" Breeze (1956–2021)
 Yvonne Brewster (born 1938)
 Erna Brodber (born 1940)

C
 Lady Colin Campbell (born 1949)
 Hazel Campbell (1940–2018)
 Morris Cargill (1914–2000)
 Margaret Cezair-Thompson (living)
 Colin Channer (born 1963)
 Michelle Cliff (1946–2016) 
 Aston Cooke (1958–2019)
 Carolyn Cooper (born 1950)
 Rudolph de Cordova (1860–1941)
 Christine Craig (born 1943)

D
 Robert Charles Dallas (1754–1824)
 Kwame Dawes (born 1962)
 Neville Dawes (1926–1984)
 Jean D'Costa (born 1937)
 H. G. de Lisser (1878–1944) 
 Ferdinand Dennis (born 1956)
 Nicole Dennis-Benn (born 1982)
 Marcia Douglas (living)

E
 Beverley East (born 1953)
 George Ellis (1753–1815)

F
 Alfred Fagon (1937–1986)
 Ira Lunan Ferguson (1904–1992)
 Walter Augustus Feurtado (1839–1910)
 John Figueroa (1920–1999)
 Honor Ford-Smith (born 1951)

G
 Amy Jacques Garvey (1895–1973)
 Delores Gauntlett (born 1949)
 Barbara Gloudon (1935–2022)
 Lorna Goodison (born 1947)
 Colin Grant (born 1961)

H
 Richard Hart (1917–2013)
 John Edgar Colwell Hearne (1926–1994)
 A. L. Hendriks (1922–1992) 
 Donald Hinds (born 1934)
 Nalo Hopkinson (born 1960)
 Ishion Hutchinson (living)

J
 Marlon James (born 1970)
 Evan Jones (1927–2012)

L
 Olive Lewin (1927–2013) 
 Heather Little-White (1952–2013)
 Edward Long (1734–1813)

M
 Thomas MacDermot (1870–1933)
 Claude McKay (1889–1948)
 Alecia McKenzie (living)
 Kellie Magnus (born 1970)
 Roger Mais (1905–1955)
 Rachel Manley (born 1955)
 Louis Marriott (1935—2016)
 Una Marson (1905–1965)
 Brian Meeks (born 1953)
 Kara Miller (living)
 Kei Miller (born 1978)
 Pamela Mordecai (born 1942)
 Mervyn Morris (born 1937)
 Mutabaruka (born 1952)

O
 Oku Onuora (born 1952)

P
 Kayla Perrin (born 1970?)
 Geoffrey Philp (born 1958)
 Velma Pollard (born 1937)
 Patricia Powell (born 1966)

Q
 Ada Quayle (1920–2002)

R
 Claudia Rankine (born 1963)
 Barry Reckord (1926–2011) 
 Victor Stafford Reid (1913–1987)
 Trevor Rhone (1940–2009) 
 Joan Riley (born 1958)
 Kim Robinson-Walcott (born 1956)
 Namba Roy (1910–1961)

S
 Andrew Salkey (1928–1995)
 Dennis Scott (1939–1991)
 Mary Seacole (1805–1881)
 Olive Senior (born 1941)
 Tanya Shirley (born 1976)
 Makeda Silvera (born 1955)
 Joanne M. Simpson (born 1957)
 Malachi Smith (living)
 Mikey Smith (1954–1983)
 Vanessa Spence (born 1961)

T
 Ekwueme Michael Thelwell (born 1939)
 Elean Thomas (1947–2004)
 Ralph Thompson (1928–2022)

V
 Vivian Virtue (1911–1998)

W
 Robert Wedderburn (1762–1835/36?)
 Anthony C. Winkler (1942–2015) 
 Sylvia Wynter (born 1928)

Z
 Fiona Zedde (born 1976)

See also
 Jamaican literature

Jamaican writers
Jamaican